The Political Party (Det politiske parti) was a satirical but nevertheless real political party created by the Norwegian comedians Johan Golden and Atle Antonsen. The party made its first entry in Norwegian politics during the Norwegian general election of 2001, promoting the two leaders with slogans like "Atle Antonsen — Working for all the people" and "Johan Golden — Your slave in parliament" (the latter one raising some eyebrows, as Golden is of black Caribbean descent). Golden was also fronted as the party's candidate for Prime Minister.

According to the party's platform, any representative of the party elected to parliament was to vote whatever the people wanted him or her to vote. To find out what the people wanted, they were to hold a poll on their web-site for every parliamentary issue the party got involved in. They also claimed that, were the people to vote 70% in favour and 30% against an issue, they would work 70% for it and 30% against it. Thus the Political Party in some sense promoted the thought of direct democracy. The party program states that the Political Party is founded on the ideals of freedom, justice and politics.

In the general election of 2001 the party got nearly 1% of all votes made. The result was rather different in the school-elections where the Political Party got 8% of the votes. If these had been parliamentary elections, the party would have gained approximately 12 representatives in parliament.

The Political Party was active only in the general election of 2001.

Notes
An electoral propaganda poster that depicts the Political Party's idea of direct democracy.

External links
 The official web pages of the Political Party (Norwegian)
 Electoral poster of Johan Golden and Atle Antonsen.

Defunct political parties in Norway
Joke political parties in Norway
Political parties established in 2000
2000 establishments in Norway
Political parties with year of disestablishment missing